The Isla Vieques dwarf gecko (Sphaerodactylus inigoi) is a species of lizard in the family Sphaerodactylidae. It is endemic to Vieques and western Culebra in Puerto Rico. Sphaerodactylus inigoi was previously considered a subspecies of Sphaerodactylus macrolepis was but was elevated to full species status based on morphological and molecular data.

References

Sphaerodactylus
Reptiles of Puerto Rico
Endemic fauna of Puerto Rico
Reptiles described in 1966
Taxa named by Richard Thomas (herpetologist)
Taxa named by Albert Schwartz (zoologist)